The men's relay competition of the Sochi 2014 Olympics was held at Laura Biathlon & Ski Complex on 22 February 2014.

On 15 February 2020, it was announced that because of a doping violation Evgeny Ustyugov and Russian relay team had been disqualified from the 2014 Olympics. There is no official decision by IOC yet.

Results
The race started at 18:30.

References

Relay